The 1994 PGA Championship was the 76th PGA Championship, held August 11–14 at Southern Hills Country Club in Tulsa, Oklahoma. Nick Price led wire-to-wire (he shared the first round lead and then led on his own after every other round) and won his third and final major title, six strokes ahead of runner-up Corey Pavin. It was Price's second consecutive major and second PGA Championship in three years. Following this win, he moved to the top of the Official World Golf Ranking.

Price became the first to win the Open Championship and PGA Championship in the same year in seven decades, last by Walter Hagen in 1924. Greg Norman had just missed the previous year, losing in a playoff; it was later accomplished by Tiger Woods in 2000 and 2006, Pádraig Harrington in 2008, and Rory McIlroy in 2014.

Price's 269 was a record for the event, passing the 271 of Bobby Nichols set thirty years earlier in 1964. It lasted just a year, lowered to 267 in 1995 at Riviera by Steve Elkington and Colin Montgomerie. (It was further lowered in 2001 by David Toms' 265.)

Price's 6-stroke win was the largest margin of victory at a major championship between Jack Nicklaus' 7-stroke victory at the 1980 PGA Championship and Tiger Woods' 12-stroke victory at the 1997 Masters Tournament. Price later described it as the best he'd ever played.

This was the fifth major held at Southern Hills; it previously hosted the PGA Championship in 1970 and 1982 and the U.S. Open in 1958 and 1977. It later hosted the U.S. Open in 2001 and the PGA Championship in 2007 and 2022.

Course layout

Round summaries

First round
Thursday, August 11, 1994

Second round
Friday, August 12, 1994

Third round
Saturday, August 13, 1994

Final round
Sunday, August 14, 1994

Source:

References

External links
PGA.com – 1994 PGA Championship
Yahoo! Sports: 1994 PGA Championship leaderboard

PGA Championship
Golf in Oklahoma
Sports in Tulsa, Oklahoma
PGA Championship
PGA Championship
PGA Championship
PGA Championship